Tumbleweed Theater was an American anthology television series starring western/comedy band Riders in the Sky which ran from 1983 to 1988. The premise of the show was each week, the Riders would present a B-Western/Singing Cowboy movie from the 1930s and 40s and perform songs and sketches between the film.

Creation 
In late 1982, the Riders in the Sky were approached by Steve Arwood, Ned Ramage, and Randy Hale to host this anthology series to be featured on a new television network called The Nashville Network. The Riders agreed to host and began taping the host segments for season one in January 1983. It premiered on March 7, 1983, the same day The Nashville Network began broadcasting. An original pilot was shot at the new Bullet Studios on Music Row on 1" tape, It was a music only pilot.  It featured John Hartford and Buddy Spicher as special guest. The first "musical/comedy show" was a pilot shot on 1" type B tape from a borrowed video truck from Leon Russell (thanks to Jim Martin). The only place to edit type B was in Leon's truck. The remainder of the season (26 shows) was at WSMV studios (Knob Hill) (Larry Bearden as shader) (1" type C). Season two was on the new Opry stage at Opryland. Season 3 was shot in Studio C at Opryland.  The masters are stored at CMT. Randy Hale has the original pilot shows. Celebration Productions was the video production company.

Season Four & Five 
By 1986, three seasons worth of material had been filmed for Tumbleweed Theater. When Steve Arwood went in settle contracts for season four with TNN's new director of programing Paul Corbin, Corbin inquired if the Riders were managed by David Skepner. When Arwood told Corbin that the Riders were managed by Skepner, Corbin stated "Well, we don't really like David Skepner around here," and the Riders were fired from TNN. A fourth and fifth season was made up of repackaged sketches from the previous three seasons.

Cast 
 Douglas B. Green - Ranger Doug and other characters.
 Paul Chrisman - Woody Paul and other characters.
 Fred LaBour - Too Slim and other characters.
 Steve Arwood - Texas Bix Bender (The Announcer)

Crew 
 Director/Switcher - Jim "Moose" Edwards
 Director/Editor - Randy Hale
 Producers - Steve Arwood, Randy Hale, Ned Ramage
  Show Creators - Ned Ramage, Randy Hale

Legacy 
TNN would later revisit the idea of showing classic black and white B-Westerns with Roy Rogers' Happy Trails Theater and Gene Autry's Melody Ranch. Rogers and Autry would host their respective shows and talk about the movie of the week in between the films.

Riders Radio Theater 
Many of the sketches and characters that originated from Tumbleweed Theater would be carried over into Riders Radio Theater, a National Public Radio show hosted by the Riders.

Home media
A VHS tape titled The Best of Tumbleweed Theater was the only official home video release of any Tumbleweed Theater clips, which was only select songs and sketches pthe Riders performed on the show. It was only released and sold through the Riders official website and at concert events. The tape was re-released in the late 90s and later sold as an official DVD in the mid 2000s.

References

External links
Tumbleweed Theater on IMDb

1983 American television series debuts
1988 American television series endings
1980s American anthology television series
1980s American musical comedy television series
1980s American sketch comedy television series
1980s Western (genre) television series
English-language television shows
The Nashville Network original programming